Roger Gimbel (March 11, 1925 – April 26, 2011) was an American television producer who specialized in television movies. Many of Gimbel's television films dealt with real-life events, including Chernobyl: The Final Warning, S.O.S. Titanic, The Amazing Howard Hughes, and The Autobiography of Miss Jane Pittman. Often, Gimbel's films also focused on serious societal problems, including mental illness, war, and domestic abuse. Gimbel produced more than 50 television films and specials, which earned eighteen Emmy Awards.

Biography
Gimbel was born in Philadelphia, Pennsylvania, on March 11, 1925, into the family who owned the Gimbels department store. His parents were Julia (née de Fernex Millhiser) and the Col. Richard Gimbel, U.S.A.F. He enrolled at Yale University, where he studied economics. Gimbel served as a member of the United States Army Air Forces in Italy during World War II.

In 1973, Gimbel won an Emmy with George Schaefer for their work as the executive producers of A War of Children (1972), which centered on Protestant and Catholic friends during the Northern Ireland conflict. His other credits as producer include The Glass House (1972), I Heard the Owl Call My Name (1973), The Autobiography of Miss Jane Pittman (1974), Tell Me Where It Hurts (1974), Queen of the Stardust Ballroom (1975), The Amazing Howard Hughes (1977), Shattered Dreams (1990), and Chernobyl: The Final Warning (1991).

Personal life
Gimbel was married three times. His first marriage ended in divorce; his second wife, Nancy Straus Gimbel, died in 1972. In 1976, Gimbel married his third wife, actress Jennifer Warren. Roger Gimbel died from pneumonia at Cedars-Sinai Medical Center in Los Angeles, California, on April 26, 2011, at the age of 86. He had four children with his second wife: Jeff, Stephen Martin (predeceased), Sam, and Liza; and a son, Barney, with Warren.

At one time when he lived in an 18th-floor Sutton Place apartment overlooking the East River, he liked to catch fish from his apartment window.

References

External links

1925 births
2011 deaths
American people of German-Jewish descent
Television producers from Pennsylvania
Burials at Forest Lawn Memorial Park (Hollywood Hills)
Deaths from pneumonia in California
Emmy Award winners
Businesspeople from Philadelphia
Gimbel family